Áslaug Arna Sigurbjörnsdóttir (born 30 November 1990) is an Icelandic politician who is a member of the Althing (Iceland's parliament) for the Reykjavík South constituency since 2016. She also served as the Secretary of the Independence Party from 2015 to 2019. In September 2019, she was named the Minister of Justice. In November 2021, she was named the Minister of Higher Education, Science and Innovation.

Education and professional life 
Áslaug was born in Reykjavík and has lived there all her life. She graduated from the University of Iceland in 2015 with a bachelor degree in law. She received her M.L. in law from the same university in 2017 for a thesis on referendums and their legal impact on democratic governance.

Alongside her studies, Áslaug has worked as a reporter for the newspaper Morgunblaðið and its website mbl.is, a police officer for the police department of the southern region of Iceland, an intern for the law firm Juris, and (briefly) a fisherwoman.

Political career 
Áslaug served as chairman of the independence party youth movement in Reykjavík from 2011 to 2013. In October 2015, she ran for the position of secretary of the independence party against, then secretary of the independence party, Guðlaugur Þór Þórðarson, after she declared her interest in the position Guðlaugur decided to step aside. She was elected the new secretary of the Independence Party and received 91.9 percent of the votes cast.

In the 2016 elections, she was elected to parliament for the Reykjavík North constituency and again in the 2017 elections. As of 2017, she served as the deputy chairman of the parliamentary group of the Independence Party. She was the chairman of the Foreign Affairs Committee 2017–2019 and chairman of the Icelandic delegation to the Inter-Parliamentary Union (IPU).

She was named a 2022 Politician of Year by One Young World, receiving her award in Manchester, England in September 2022 alongside four other young politicians from around the world.

Personal life 

Her mother, Kristín Steinarsdóttir, was a teacher; she died of cancer in 2012. Her father, Sigurbjörn Magnússon, is a Supreme Court attorney. Áslaug has two siblings.

References

External links 
 Biography of Áslaug Arna Sigurbjörnsdóttir on the parliament website (English)
 Official website (Icelandic)

Living people
1990 births
Áslaug Arna Sigurbjörnsdóttir
21st-century Icelandic politicians
Áslaug Arna Sigurbjörnsdóttir
Áslaug Arna Sigurbjörnsdóttir
Áslaug Arna Sigurbjörnsdóttir
Áslaug Arna Sigurbjörnsdóttir
Áslaug Arna Sigurbjörnsdóttir
Áslaug Arna Sigurbjörnsdóttir
Female justice ministers
Justice ministers of Iceland
Icelandic women lawyers